Sacred Cow Productions is a production company founded by filmmaker and author Kevin Booth and the late comedian Bill Hicks. SCP has produced videos and albums of comedians such as Hicks himself, Joe Rogan and Doug Stanhope, hard-hitting subjects like the drug wars, and controversial subject matter such as Waco siege and the September 11 attacks.

Overview
Sacred Cow Productions is a privately held organization, run by Kevin Booth. It is located in Studio City, California.

Productions
Sacred Cow Productions produced the following films and videos:

They were also distributors of How Weed Won the West and American Drug War: The Last White Hope.

References

External links
 Sacred Cow Productions Website.
 American Drug War Website.
 How Weed Won the West Website.

Film production companies of the United States